Buneville is a commune in the Pas-de-Calais department in the Hauts-de-France region in northern France.

Geography
A farming village located 20 miles (32 km) southwest of Arras on the D23 road, at the junction with the D83.

Population

Sights
 The church of Notre-Dame, dating from the eighteenth century

See also
Communes of the Pas-de-Calais department

References

Communes of Pas-de-Calais